The Conestoga Formation is a geologic formation in Pennsylvania.

Description
Light-gray, thin-bedded, impure, contorted limestone having shale partings; conglomeratic at base; in Chester Valley, includes micaceous limestone in upper part, phyllite in middle, and alternating dolomite and limestone in lower part.

Type section
Named from outcrops along Conestoga River, Lancaster County, Pennsylvania.

References

Cambrian geology of Pennsylvania
Ordovician geology of Pennsylvania
Geologic formations of Pennsylvania